Pristimantis euphronides is a species of frog in the family Strabomantidae. It is endemic to Grenada, an island in the Lesser Antilles, the Caribbean. Is sometimes known as the Grenada frog. It was originally described as a subspecies of Eleutherodactylus urichi (=Pristimantis urichi), but since 1994 it has been recognized as a full species.

Description
Adult males measure  and adult females  in snout–vent length. The snout is rounded. The tympanum is distinct. Males have a subgular vocal sac.

Pristimantis euphronides has a dark brown dorsal surface, and a cream-colored ventral surface, with orange tinting on the rear of its thighs. Its lips are mottled, and its upper iris is bronze. A dark supra-tympanic stripe runs from the corner of its eye to its armpit.

Males call around dusk, usually from high perches. Females are usually seen near the ground.

Distribution and habitat
Its natural habitats are rainforests as well as forest edges and montane meadows surrounded by agriculture. The eggs are deposited on the ground and have direct development (i.e., there is no free-living larval stage).

Pristimantis euphronides is moderately common in suitable habitat, but its range is small. Moreover, it is threatened by habitat loss primarily caused by urbanization and tourism development, but also by agriculture. The invasive Eleutherodactylus johnstonei represents a potential threat. This species is found in the Grand Etang Forest Reserve.

References

External links
Eleutherodactylus euphronides at the Encyclopedia of Life

euphronides
Amphibians of the Caribbean
Endemic fauna of Grenada
Amphibians described in 1967
Taxa named by Albert Schwartz (zoologist)
Taxonomy articles created by Polbot